Sarah-Jane Redmond is a British actress and acting coach, living in Canada, whose work has spanned film, television and theatre productions, often in science fiction roles. She has taught acting at the New Image College of Fine Arts in British Columbia and directed theatre performances there. Some of her roles have been in collaboration with screenwriter Chris Carter, who cast her in several of his television series. Best known as Lucy Butler on ‘’Millennium’’ (1997-1999)

Early life
Redmond was born in Cyprus, where her father was stationed during his career with the Royal Air Force. Her family moved to the Lake District in England, before emigrating to Canada when she was ten. She studied acting in Canada and England before founding an amateur theatre company, Holy Barbarians, to pursue stage work. Part of her study was at the acting school of Canadian actor William B. Davis. During that time, she also worked as a dancer in Toronto.

Career
Redmond's first television role was in an episode of The X-Files; this introduced her to director David Nutter and writer Chris Carter, who later gave her a recurring role in the series Millennium, and a part in the 2008 film The X-Files: I Want to Believe. Her other television roles have been in the science-fiction shows Harsh Realm, Andromeda, Dark Angel, The Outer Limits and Smallville.

Redmond's feature film appearances include 2002's Hellraiser: Hellseeker; she auditioned for this role using bondage artwork by Eric Stanton instead of a standard actor's headshot. Her other film roles include The Sisterhood of the Traveling Pants, Case 39, The Invitation, and The Entrance. The latter earned Redmond a Leo Award nomination in 2007 for Best Lead Performance by a Female in a Feature Length Drama.

Redmond also taught acting at the New Image College of Fine Arts in Vancouver, British Columbia. During her time with the faculty, she directed the college's 2011 production of the Stephen Adly Guirgis play The Last Days of Judas Iscariot, alongside fellow actor Frank Cassini.

Personal life
Redmond is a boxing and martial arts enthusiast, and has participated in charity walks for the British Columbia Cancer Foundation. She has a son, Lucas Noon-Redmond, who was born in October 2007.

Filmography

Film

Television

References

Sources

External links
Official website

Year of birth missing (living people)
British film actresses
British stage actresses
British television actresses
Living people